Scotty Lago (born November 12, 1987) is an American snowboarder. He is the 2004 world quarterpipe champion and winner of a bronze medal at the 2010 Winter Olympics.

Career
Lago has been riding since 1996. He is sponsored by Hudsen Collective, ION cameras, Mountain Dew, Smith Optics and Friends.  He began snowboarding at a local tubing hill in Amesbury, Massachusetts.

Lago was a member of the 2010 U.S. Olympic Snowboarding team along with Shaun White, Greg Bretz, and Louie Vito. On February 17, 2010, Lago won the bronze medal with a score of 42.8 out of 50.0.

On February 19, 2010, controversial photos surfaced of Lago with his bronze medal and Team USA gear. Due to these photos, he returned home before the end of the games.

Personal life
Lago is from Seabrook, New Hampshire. He has raised money for the Floating Hospital for Children in Boston. When Lago is not snowboarding, he enjoys hunting and fishing. Scotty has a younger brother named William and an older brother named Jason. In July 2016 Scotty married former Miss New Hampshire, Bridget Brunet. Lago passes on his love of snowboarding to young snowboarder campers at High Cascade Snowboard Camp, during his Signature Session, Session 5: July  26 – August 3. Lago is a member of the Frends Crew made up of snowboarders Mason Aguirre, Kevin Pearce, Danny Davis, Keir Dillon, Jack Mitrani, Mikkel Bang and Luke Mitrani. Frends is a group of riders who turned their initial friendship into a formal alliance in 2007 to move the sport away from its recent competitive and business focus and return the sport to its grassroots, collegial beginnings.

Career highlights 
 2004 World Quarterpipe Champion
 1st place 2006 Fis World Cup Halfpipe
 1st place 2006 Paul Mitchell Progression Session
 3rd place 2006 X Games Halfpipe
 5th place 2007 O'Neil Evolution Quarterpipe
 3rd place 2007 Grand Prix Slopestyle
 2nd place 2007 Van Cup
 2nd place 2007 New Zealand Open Halfpipe
 1st place 2007 World Cup Halfpipe Opener
 2nd place 2008 Air & Style Quarterpipe
 2nd place 2009 X Games Slopestyle
 1st place 2009 Burton US Open Quarterpipe
 3rd place 2009 Burton US Open Slopestyle
 2nd place 2010 Grand Prix Halfpipe
 2nd place 2010 Grand Prix Halfpipe
 3rd place 2010 Winter Olympics
 2nd place 2011 Winter X Games Halfpipe
 1st place 2012 Toyota Big Air

References

External links
 
 
 
 
 

1987 births
American male snowboarders
Living people
Olympic bronze medalists for the United States in snowboarding
Snowboarders at the 2010 Winter Olympics
People from Seabrook, New Hampshire
Sportspeople from Rockingham County, New Hampshire
Medalists at the 2010 Winter Olympics
X Games athletes
20th-century American people
21st-century American people